Günter Siegmund (19 December 1936 – 13 September 2020) was an East German heavyweight boxer who won the bronze medal in international competitions in both 1960 and 1961.

He competed for the SC Dynamo Berlin / Sportvereinigung (SV) Dynamo.

1960 Olympic results
Below are the results of Gunter Siegmund, an East German heavyweight boxer who competed at the 1960 Rome Olympics:

 Round of 32: bye
 Round of 16: defeated Max Bösiger (Switzerland)
 Quarterfinal: defeated Vasile Mariuţan (Romania)
 Semifinal: lost to Daniel Bekker (South Africa) (was awarded a bronze medal)

References

1936 births
2020 deaths
Heavyweight boxers
Olympic boxers of the United Team of Germany
Boxers at the 1960 Summer Olympics
Olympic bronze medalists for the United Team of Germany
Olympic medalists in boxing
German male boxers
People from Kostrzyn nad Odrą
Sportspeople from Lubusz Voivodeship
Medalists at the 1960 Summer Olympics